Malewiebamani was a Kushite King of Meroe.

Prenomen: Kheperkare ("Re is one whose ka is manifest")
Nomen: Malewiebamani

Malewiebamani's mother was likely Queen Saka'aye. Malewiebamani was the son of either Nasakhma or Siaspiqa.

Amanineteyerike and Baskakeren are thought to be sons of Malewiebamani.

Malewiebamani succeeded Nasakhma and in turn was succeeded by Talakhamani, who could be either a son or a younger brother of Malewiebamani.

A Royal wife named Akhrasan from the time of Malewiebamani was buried at Nuri. Her relation to the king is not known.

Malewiebamani's name is known from a Shawabti and from intrusive items from pyramid Nuri 16 bearing his name. On the dedication stela of Aspelta, a private name occurs which is very similar to Malewiebamani's name. His nomen appears at Kawa.

References

5th-century BC monarchs of Kush
Year of birth unknown
430s BC deaths